The Last Child is a 1971 American TV film. It was the last film of Van Heflin.

Plot
In the future, overpopulation has meant that people are allowed to have only one child and are denied all medical care (save for palliative care) when they turn 65.

Reception
Reviewing the film in the present day for the SF Weekly, David-Elijah Nahmod wrote: When The Last Child was first broadcast on ABC in October 1971, star Michael Cole was enjoying a brief brush with stardom on the hit cop show The Mod Squad. The actor proved his acting chops with this intense drama set in the “not too distant future”.

Many issues come up during the film’s 71 minute running time — The Last Child remains potent and topical even today.

The film's primary question is a woman's right to autonomy over her body. Women today are once again being forced to fight for the right to decide for themselves whether or not to practice birth control or whether or not to have an abortion. The Last Child underscores many of those battles by reversing the question: what if a woman was forced to have an abortion against her will? At what point does a woman get to choose for herself without interference from others? At what point is the government overstepping its boundaries and interfering in a person's personal life?

Cole and Janet Margolin star as Alan and Karen, a couple still mourning the loss of their baby the year before. Karen is pregnant again, but in the grossly overpopulated futuristic society they live in, only one child per couple is allowed.

The fact that Karen’s baby died is of little consequence to the population control police, headed by a sociopathic Ed Asner. Asner was, at the time, achieving TV immortality for his delightful portrayal of the grumpy-if-kindhearted Mr. Grant on The Mary Tyler Moore Show. He offers a deliciously over-the-top, against-type performance as The Last Child’s villain.

Cast
Michael Cole as Alan Miller
Janet Margolin as Karen Miller
Harry Guardino as Howard Drumm
Van Heflin as Senator Quincy George
Edward Asner as Barstow
Kent Smith as Gus Iverson
Michael Larrain as Sandy
Philip Bourneuf as Dr Tyler
Barbara Babcock as Shelley Drumm
Victor Izay as Silverman

References

External links
The Last Child at IMDb
The Last Child at TCMDB

1971 television films
1971 films
ABC Movie of the Week
Films directed by John Llewellyn Moxey